The Ricoh WG-M1 is a rugged digital compact camera announced by Ricoh on September 10, 2014. It features 120fps high speed videography as well as full HD capture at 30p with electronic image stabilisation. It is waterproof to a depth of 10 meters and shockproof to drops from up to 2 meters. It includes WiFi and is can be remote-operated using a smart phone. Ricoh claims that underwater sounds can be captured without muffling. In 2015, the WG-M1 won the TIPA Award in the category Best Actioncam.

References

External links 
 WG-M1 at us.ricoh-imaging.com
 specifications at dpreview

Action cameras
Cameras introduced in 2014
WG-M1